Bridgewater is an incorporated town in Rockingham County, Virginia, United States. The population was 6,596 at the 2020 census. It is included in the Harrisonburg, Virginia Metropolitan Statistical Area.

History 
William Magill first settled along the North River in 1746, and the area became known as Magill's Ford. The first bridge across the North River was built in 1820, and for a time the young community was known as Bridgeport. The Town received its charter from the Virginia General Assembly on February 7, 1835, then incorporated as Bridgewater.  Every February 7, the Town holds an annual Charter Day celebration to commemorate the granting of the charter.

Bridgewater College is located within the Town, and was first established in 1880. The college has grown along with the Town, now enrolling more than 1,800 students.

Since the creation of the Town in 1835, Bridgewater has endured six major floods, including a devastating flood in 1949 that claimed two lives.  As a result, the US Army Corps of Engineers constructed a long earthen levee to protect large portions of the Town against future flooding.

Since the mid-1990s, the Town has held a "Summer's End Celebration" on Labor Day each year. The event has grown to include a 5k race, carnival rides, and live music, and is attended by thousands of people.

Geography 

Most of the town is located within a bend of the North River. Floods have wrecked the town occasionally. The northern areas are partly shielded from flooding with an Army Corps of Engineers dam. The wooded monadnock called Round Hill (elevation approx. 1750 feet) dominates the town's western skyline.

Transportation
The main highways providing access to Bridgewater are Virginia State Route 42 and Virginia State Route 257. These two highways overlap from Bridgewater northwards to Dayton. SR 42 runs north-south and connects with U.S. Route 33 in Harrisonburg. SR 257 runs east-west and connects with Interstate 81 near Mount Crawford.

Demographics 

As of the 2020 census, 6,596 people, 2,137 households in the town. The population density was 2,618.5 people per square mile (941.7/km2). The racial makeup of the town was 89.0% White, 5.2% African American, with no other races exceeding one percent. For comparison, the 2010 census reflected a population 92.2% White and 2.4% African American. Hispanic or Latino of any race were 4.1% of the population in 2020, down from 4.9% in 2010.

According to the 2011-2015 American Community Survey 5-year estimates, the median income for a household in the town was $55,205, and for a family was $62,483. Males had a median income of $45,533 versus $36,919 for females. The per capita income for the town was $24,854. About 4.7% of families and 5.4% of the population were below the poverty line, including 6.7% of those under age 18 and 3.8% of those age 65 or over.

Community policing and safety 
Chief Phillip Read leads a ten-officer police department, which also polices the Town of Mt. Crawford. Bridgewater consistently ranks in the top 10 safest communities in Virginia.  Most recently, Bridgewater was ranked #2 by Safewise in their “Virginia’s 20 Safest Cities of 2020” based on the Town's low “violent crimes per capita” and “property crimes per capita” as listed in the FBI's Uniform Crime Report.  Bridgewater also is frequently ranked as one of the best places to live in Virginia, most recently ranked #3 in “Best Places to Live in Virginia for 2020” by HomeSnacks.  Bridgewater's police department puts an emphasis on community policing.

Parks and recreation 

The Town of Bridgewater is home to 13 parks, totaling over 99 acres of land.  The parks provide everything from picnic shelters, BBQ grills, riverwalks and fishing, bird watching, a fitness trail, playgrounds, tennis courts, and a little league field. The parks and recreation also include a nine-hole golf course and an 18-hole miniature golf course, an arboretum, and an ice skating rink.

Generations Park 
Opened in 2015, Generations Park features ice skating during the winter season. Ice skating season begins on Thanksgiving Day and is open daily through the beginning of March. The skating is free for all Town residents who present a B-Rec pass. A nominal fee is charged for non-residents.  Throughout the rest of the year, Generations Park is home to the After Dark at Gen Park concert and movie series, the Harris Concert series, and other events.

Sandy Bottom Par-3 and Mini-Golf 
Located at 610 East College St., Sandy Bottom Park is home to Bridgewater's Par-3 nine-hole golf course, and an 18-hole miniature golf course. The park facilities also include a practice green, restrooms, several picnic tables, two gazebos, and ample parking. The Par-3 and Mini-Golf remain open from April 1 through October 31. The courses are free for all Town residents who present a B-Rec pass. A nominal fee is charged for non-residents. Mini-Golf is also available for private parties.

Oakdale Park 
The biggest and busiest of the town parks, Oakdale is home to our Summer's End Celebration as well as the North River Library and the Bridgewater Little League Program. The park has three picnic areas (Shelter Nos. 1 and 2 each have 10 tables, and Shelter No. 3 has 16 tables with restroom facilities attached). Park amenities include a basketball court, two playgrounds (one for preschool children, the other for school-aged children), BBQ grills and water spigots at the shelters, four horseshoe pits, plenty of off-street parking, and open areas to run and play. Baseball field #4 is available for public use.

Other park features 

 Bridgeview Park: home to quarter mile fitness walking trail, children's fitness center, and riverfront bench swings.  
 Seven Bridges: features riverfront swings, a gazebo, and commemorative signs marking some of Bridgewater's Civil War history. 

 Edgebriar Park: has a handicap-accessible fishing pier, backgammon and chess inlaid game tables, and a water garden with a waterfall and a variety of fish and plants.  
 Wildwood Park: allows fishing and includes a playground, picnic shelter, BBQ grill, and a platform called Downrush Vista overlooking the North River.
 Wynant Park: this small pocket park has a playground, hammock, and picnic table. 
 Bird Sanctuary: with 3/4 of an acre, this park has quiet seclusion and shelter provided by trees and shrubs for bird watching.
 Dinkel-Harris Gateway at Warm Springs Turnpike Park: details the historical significance of what was once known as the Warm Springs Turnpike.  
 Cooks Creek Arboretum: this eight-acre park includes many trees planted by Bridgewater's Turner Ashby High School students, a walking path, and several picnic tables.
 Harrison Park: home to the Doug Will Tennis Center with two indoor tennis courts, two pickleball courts as well as a full basketball court and playground.  
 Whitelow Park: named for Bridgewater resident Carlyle Whitelow, this park includes a walking trail, play structure, and swing set.

Sipe Center 
In November 2019, the Town of Bridgewater opened Sipe Center.  Located at 100 North Main Street, Sipe Center is a state-of-the-art movie theater and performing arts center, with a seating capacity of 154. Formerly a storefront, the Town purchased the deteriorated historic 19th-century W.H. Sipe Company, Inc building in 2017 and demolished it due to numerous structural issues. The Sipe Center, which replaced the old building, is an entirely new purpose-built multi-use theater with some exterior elements inspired by the original Sipe building.  Sipe Center hosts approximately two live performances every month, from productions of Shakespeare, magic shows and live music. The Town Council meetings are also held at Sipe Center.

See also 
 Shenandoah Valley

References

External links

Official website
Sipe Center website
Commercial site BridgewaterVa.com

Towns in Rockingham County, Virginia
Populated places established in 1835
1835 establishments in Virginia
Towns in Virginia